The 1981–82 Montenegrin Republic League was the 37th season of Montenegrin Republic League, the third league in Montenegrin football. The season started in August 1981 and finished in May 1982.

Season 

In Montenegrin Republic League 1981-82 participated 14 teams. Among the clubs which didn't play on previous season were Lovćen (relegated from Yugoslav Second League) and three best teams from lower tier - Zabjelo, Tara Cetinje and Ivangrad.
The title won Lovćen, with three points more than Čelik

Table

Higher leagues 
On season 1981–82, four Montenegrin teams played in higher leagues of SFR Yugoslavia. Budućnost participated in 1981–82 Yugoslav First League, while three other teams (Sutjeska, OFK Titograd and Mogren) played in 1981–82 Yugoslav Second League.

See also 
 Montenegrin Republic League
Montenegrin Republic Cup (1947–2006)
Montenegrin clubs in Yugoslav football competitions (1946–2006)
Montenegrin Football Championship (1922–1940)

References 

Montenegrin Republic League
1981–82 in Yugoslav football
1981–82 in European third tier association football leagues